Spring Creek is a tributary stream of the French Broad River in Madison County, North Carolina with a length of approximately 17 miles.  It flows in much of its lower course through a section of the Pisgah National Forest and passes the communities of Trust, Luck, and Joe.  It joins the French Broad river in Hot Springs, North Carolina.

References
USGS link

Rivers of Madison County, North Carolina
Rivers of North Carolina